Hot Country Songs and Country Airplay are charts that rank the top-performing country music songs in the United States, published by Billboard magazine.  At the start of 2012, Hot Country Songs ranked songs based on weekly airplay data from country music radio stations compiled by Nielsen Broadcast Data Systems.  With effect from the issue dated October 20, 2012, however, the magazine significantly altered the methodology of this chart, incorporating digital downloads, streaming, and airplay not only from country stations but from stations of all formats.  These changes were controversial, as some critics felt that they unduly benefited acts with crossover appeal, as opposed to those whose songs were played only on country stations.  At the same time, Billboard launched the new Country Airplay listing, which used the methodology of ranking tracks based solely on country radio airplay.  Although this chart was published for the first time in 2012, Billboard retrospectively considers the period since Hot Country Songs began using Nielsen data in 1990 to also form part of the history of the Country Airplay listing.

An immediate beneficiary of the change in methodology for the Hot Country Songs chart was Taylor Swift.  In the first week of the new system, her song "We Are Never Ever Getting Back Together", which had been falling down the chart and had been at number 21 the previous week based on country radio airplay alone, rose straight to number one when streaming, downloads, and plays on other radio formats began to be counted.  Swift's song would remain in the top spot for nine consecutive weeks, setting a new record for the longest unbroken run at number one by a female singer held since 1965 by Connie Smith's "Once a Day".  Based on country radio airplay alone, however, Swift's song dropped even further to number 36 on the first published Country Airplay chart, the same week that it jumped to number one on Hot Country Songs.  The song's greater popularity on pop music radio than country stations highlighted Swift's increasing move away from the country genre.

After Swift's nine weeks in the top spot, the second highest total number of weeks at number one on Hot Country Songs was four.  This was achieved by Blake Shelton, who was one of six acts to have two number ones during the year.  Several acts had their first chart-toppers in 2012.  In January, "Let It Rain" by David Nail featuring Sarah Buxton spent a single week in the top spot, becoming the first number one for both singers.  The following week Eric Church achieved his first chart-topper with "Drink in My Hand".  In April "A Woman Like You" gave Lee Brice his first number one, and in June Kip Moore achieved the same feat with "Somethin' 'Bout a Truck".  At the end of August, Love and Theft reached number one for the first time with "Angel Eyes", as did Little Big Town three weeks later with "Pontoon".  In the issue of Billboard dated September 29, Hunter Hayes gained his first chart-topper with "Wanted", with which the 21-year old gained the distinction of being the youngest solo male artist to have a number-one country song.  The final act to gain a first-time chart-topper in 2012 was Florida Georgia Line, whose debut single, "Cruise", held the peak position on both charts in the last issue of Billboard of the year.  The track would go on to become the best-selling country digital single to date and set a new record for the most weeks spent at number one on the Hot Country Songs chart.

Chart history

See also
2012 in country music
List of artists who reached number one on the U.S. country chart
List of Top Country Albums number ones of 2012

References

2012
Number-one country singles
United States Country Singles